The Australian hornet (Abispa ephippium), actually a type of potter wasp or "mason wasp", is a vespid native to the Australian states and territories of the Australian Capital Territory, New South Wales, Northern Territory, Victoria, Queensland and Western Australia. 

The Australian hornet is a solitary insect, forming small nests against buildings and other structures. The adult wasp feeds on flower nectar, while the larvae are fed caterpillars captured by the female.

Description
The insect is mostly orange, with a large central black patch on the top of the thorax, and a wide black band marking the abdomen. The insect's wings are largely translucent, but tinted orange with black areas at the wing's end.

Life cycle
Being a member of the potter wasp subfamily (Eumeninae), A. ephippium females build large nests in sheltered positions using mud. The females search for prey (including spiders and caterpillars) around trees and shrubs, before sealing the captured insects inside the nest's cells. The larvae then feed upon these insects, before emerging.

References

External links
Australian hornet

Hymenoptera of Australia
Potter wasps
Insects described in 1775